Sadistic Sex Daemon is the 7th studio album by the band Misanthrope. The bonus disc is entirely sung in French, except for the last track. There was also an LP picture disc released in July 2005 by Painkiller Records, which was limited to 500 copies.

Track listing

Original album

 Révisionniste - 5:33
 Sadistic Sex Daemon - 4:21
 La Marche des Cornus - 6:41
 Armageddon à l'Élysée - 4:34
 Conversation Métapsychique - 5:28 
 Grand Démonologue - 4:46
 L'Extinction d'une Etoile - 5:07
 Bonaparte - 4:09 
 Sans Complaisance - 4:44 
 Le Dernier Répond - 0:12 
 Romantisme Noir - 4:50

Bonus disc

 Nouvel Enfer - 4:13
 Chair Organique - 4:49
 Conversation Métapsychique (Instrumental version) - 5:29
 L'extinction D'une Étoile (Instrumental version) - 5:07
 The Horns Walk - 6:43
 Sadistic Sex Daemon (English Version) - 4:19

LP picture disc

Side A (English vocals)

 Revisionist
 Sadistic Sex Daemon
 The Horns Walk
 Great Daemonologist
 Extinction of a Star

Side B (French vocals)

 Conversation Métapsychique
 Sans Complaisance
 Bonaparte
 Le Dernier Répond
 Romantisme Noir
 Nouvel Enfer

External links
Sadistic Sex Daemon at Encyclopaedia Metallum

2003 albums
Misanthrope (band) albums